The giant ghost-faced bat (Mormoops magna) is a prehistoric species of bat that was endemic to the Caribbean. It is only known from fragmental humerus remains, which physically resemble those of Mormoops megalophylla but are larger in size.

References

Phyllostomidae
Holocene extinctions
Mammals described in 1974
Fossil taxa described in 1974